Farooq Nazki is a poet, broadcaster and media personality from the Indian Union Territory of Jammu and Kashmir. He also served as Director Doordarshan & AIR Srinagar from 1986 to 1997 under Ministry of Information and Broadcasting (India). Besides media head and writing career, Nazki has also served as Editor "Daily Mazdoor" from 1960 a newspaper highlighting the problems labours class. This newspaper for the first time made conscious efforts to highlight the importance of labour in the valley. In 2000 he retired as its Deputy Director General. He was media advisor to two Chief Ministers: Farooq Abdullah (in 1983 and 1990–2002) and Omar Abdullah (2010).

Honours and awards 
In 1995 he won the Sahitya Academy award in Kashmiri language literature for his book of poetry, Naar Hyutun Kanzal Wanas ( Fire in the eyelashes). He has also won the state cultural Academy Award for both that work and Lafz Lafz Noha. He also won Jammu & Kashmir Academy of culture, Art & Languages Best book Award for his Kashmiri book . For Media contributions he won Gold Medal J&K Government for Best management of electronic media. Further he won Award for best media controller in Asiad 1982.

Publications

Urdu Books 
 Lafz Lafz Navha
 Akhri Khwab Se Pehlay

Kashmiri Books 
 Nar Hutron Kazal
 Wannas, Mahjabeen

See also 
List of Sahitya Akademi Award winners for Kashmiri

References

Further reading 
 http://www.risingkashmir.com/revolutionary-poet-gr-gayoor-remembered/ 

Place of birth missing (living people)
Living people
Kashmiri poets
Poets from Jammu and Kashmir
University of Kashmir alumni
Recipients of the Sahitya Akademi Award in Kashmiri
Indian male poets
20th-century Indian poets
20th-century Indian male writers
1940 births